Muthoot Finance Ltd is an Indian financial corporation and the largest gold loan NBFC in the country. In addition to financing gold loans, the company offers other forms of loans, insurance and money transfer services, and sells gold coins. The company is headquartered in Kochi, Kerala and operates over 4,400 branches throughout the country. Outside India, Muthoot Finance is established in the UK, the US, and the United Arab Emirates.

The company falls under the brand umbrella of the Muthoot Group. Its stocks are listed on the BSE and NSE since its initial public offering in 2011. The target market of Muthoot Finance includes small businesses, vendors, farmers, traders, SME business owners, and salaried individuals.

Corporate background 

The company was incorporated as a private limited company on 14 March 1997 with the name "The Muthoot Finance Private Limited" under the Companies Act.

On 18 November 2008, the company was converted into a public limited company with the name "Muthoot Finance Limited". During the year 2009–10, the company added 620 new branches.

In July 2016, Muthoot Finance acquired 46.83% of the capital of Belstar Investment and Finance Private Limited (BIFPL).

In May 2018, Muthoot Finance acquired Muthoot Money, a Non Deposit taking Non-Banking Financial Company.

Awards and recognition
 Muthoot Finance won the Skoch Financial Inclusion Award 2013 in recognition of its major initiative in the area of 'Access to Banking and Financial Services' to the aam aadmi who had been excluded from the country's banking network for decades.
 In 2012, Muthoot Finance was voted the most trusted finance brand in India according to the Brand Trust Report 2012, a study conducted by Trust Research Advisory. In the Brand Trust Report 2013 however, Muthoot Finance was voted second-most trusted finance brand in India, but it regained its place as India's most trusted finance brand in the Brand Trust Report 2014.
 In 2012, the company won the Asian Sustainability Leadership Award for "Best Rural Outreach.
 BFSI Award for the "Most Admired Loyalty Program" in 2012 at The Asian Leadership Awards heald at Dubai.
 Golden Peacock Award for CSR being conferred upon Muthoot Finance Ltd. in the financial services sector at the 7th International Conference on Social RESPONSIBILITY at the Dubai Global Convention 2012
 In 2013 company won the Golden Peacock Award "HR Excellence for 2013", which recognizes the continuing commitment by business to conduct itself ethically and contribute to economic development, while improving the quality of life of the workforce.

Philanthropy
All of the philanthropic activities of Muthoot Finance are conducted through the Muthoot M George Foundation, which also conducts tree plantation drives and offers scholarships to the needy on a regular basis. The company is also involved in various philanthropic initiatives, which focus on education through M George Foundation, environment, health, financial assistance and eco-friendliness. With the assistance of the Credai Clean City Movement, the company is associated with the concept of an E-toilet, which was a public sanitation initiative. Additionally, the company holds regular agricultural seminars by the name of "Ente Adukkalathottum" ("My Kitchen Garden") which educates farmers on the effects of pesticide residues in food and how to counter that for healthier living. It has also been actively involved in helping cancer patients, as well as individuals diagnosed with from kidney diseases, by financially covering medical expenses.

The company runs the Kochi Chapter of the "Horn Not Ok Please" initiative, which raises awareness on the harmful effects of vehicular noise pollution. The company has also launched a Centre for Promoting/Creating Road Traffic Awareness at the office of the Asst. Commissioner of Police in Kochi to help raise awareness about road safety and the prevention of traffic accidents.

In 2012, the Muthoot Group launched the first Paul George Memorial Tournament, which was aimed at Government School Children in the Delhi NCR region. The winners of the tournament were given scholarships.

References

External links
 

Financial services companies based in Kochi
Financial services companies established in 1939
Indian companies established in 1939
Companies listed on the National Stock Exchange of India
Companies listed on the Bombay Stock Exchange
Indian companies established in 1997